Necare was an American death-doom metal band, from Newport News, Virginia, United States. It was composed by only two members: Ryan Henry, or R.H., (guitar, bass, keyboards and vocals) and Jonathan Greer Cawthon, or G.C., (drums, guitar and keyboards). The group uses both death grunts and clean vocals and sporadically uses violin and other elements in its songs, considered mournful and bleak.

History

Necare was created in 1999. It was composed of only two members, who present themselves by their initial letters (R.H. and G.C.), but counted on the contribution of many guest musicians. The band has never played live; it was a studio band.  The name of the band is a Latin verb meaning "to kill", "to murder", or "to destroy". The band project is to discuss about death and the crisis of mankind and religions, which can no longer convincingly explain tragedy of life.  It was influenced specially by English doom metal bands, such as Anathema and My Dying Bride and other metal bands, such as Iron Maiden and Chuck Schuldiner. Their lyrics where influenced by the singer Aaron Stainthorpe and some English and American poets, such as Algernon Charles Swinburne, Alfred Tennyson, Wilfred Owen and Sylvia Plath.

Before forming Necare, Ryan Henry and Greer Cawthon played together in another band. However, dissatisfied with the project of the band, they came out and created Necare.  In the same year the band was created, Necare recorded a demo album, named Ophelia. This album counted with the participation of two guest musicians: April Leightty (violin) and Erin Vernon (vocals). However, it was never released.

One year later, Necare recorded its second independent album, Rite of Shrouds. In 2001, the band recorded another independent album, its third, Appassionata. There were five guest musicians playing in this album: Andy Henson (guitar), Erin Vernon (vocals), Amy Caroline Parker (vocals), April Leightty (violin) and Ben Snider (violin).

In 2004, Necare recorded its fourth album on Firebox Records, named Ruin.  Produced by Jhon Ackerman, the recording process took about one year to get finished.  The album counts with two guest musicians: Jhon Ackerman (guitar) and Laura (violin); all the other instruments were played by the band's own members.  Its songs criticise religion and its failure in explaining mortality. They also try to balance distortions and melancholy with long and slow songs.

Despite all the work together, Necare's members were always involved in other musical projects.  The band officially disbanded in 2004 when Ryan Henry moved on to his funeral-doom metal band Reclusiam. That same year, he was also invited to compose, as a guest musician, the Swedish Gothic-doom metal band Draconian.

Discography
1999: Ophelia
2000: Rite of Shrouds
2001: Appassionata
2004: Ruin (Firebox Records)

References

External links
Necare on Myspace

American doom metal musical groups]
Heavy metal duos